The Military ranks of Finland are the military insignia used by the Finnish Defence Forces. The ranks incorporates features from Swedish, German, and Russian armed forces. In addition, the system has some typically Finnish characteristics that are mostly due to the personnel structure of the Finnish Defence Forces. The ranks have official names in Finnish and Swedish languages and official English translations. The Swedish forms are used in all Swedish-languages communications in Finland, e.g. in Swedish-speaking units of Finnish Defence Force. The system of ranks in the Swedish Armed Forces is slightly different.

Finland practices universal conscription of men (c. 80% of each age cohort), and maintains only a cadre of paid personnel for training and maintaining military readiness. During peace time, reservists are inactive, i.e. they do not receive pay or have a position in the chain of command. Reservists are in duty only when mobilized during a crisis or when attending mandatory or voluntary refresher exercises. Nevertheless, reserve NCO or officer ranks are an entrance requirement to a military or border guard career.

Professional officers are trained at the Finnish National Defence University.

Table of ranks
The ranks currently used by the Finnish Defence Forces.

Commissioned officer ranks
The rank insignia of commissioned officers.

Other ranks
The rank insignia of non-commissioned officers and enlisted personnel.

Army training ranks

Navy training ranks

Military chaplains

Personnel groups
The military personnel of the Finnish Defence Forces is divided into three groups:
command personnel
junior command personnel
rank and file
Ranks  and  comprise the rank-and-file. The NCO students rank as privates until they are promoted to the rank of Corporal.

The junior command personnel are formed from the professional or reserve NCOs and conscripts serving in ranks of corporal, officer student, sergeant or officer candidate or their naval equivalents. However, by regulation, all professional servicemen outrank conscripts.

The command personnel is formed of commissioned officers, commissioned officer specialists, warrant officers and cadets.

Reservists belong to the personnel group determined by their military rank, but hold the position in the chain of command only from the moment they report to duty (or should have reported to duty) to the moment they have been discharged and have left the military installation. Unlike conscripts, the reservists rank with the professional military personnel without prejudice. The highest rank available to reserve officers is major, and in exceptional cases, lieutenant colonel.

Insignia

The insignia is different from other European systems by some features. Stars are not used in the insignia. Large roses, instead of oak leaves, denote ranks from major to colonel. Generals wear lions (Lion of Finland), not stars. The qualifiers  "Senior" and  "Junior" are used in the names of some ranks; for example,  is "Sergeant", while  is "Junior Sergeant" (Corporal).

In the army the insignia are placed in the collar in parade and service uniforms M/58 and M/83 and in field uniforms M/62 and M/91. The airforce places the insignia on the sleeve of M/51 instead of the collar. In the navy where they have different parade dress they place the ranks on the sleeve and they also have the M/83 insignia on the shoulders. If the insignia are placed on the arm or on the sleeve, sleeve insignia are used. In the modern field uniform M/05, the collar insignia are placed on the chest. The colours of the background and the lining on the Army and Air Force collar patches indicate branch of specialization. In field uniforms, the collar patches do not carry branch colours, borders or corner accents. The national flag is carried in all uniforms and the unit insignia on background of the serviceman's branch colour is carried on the arm in battledress M/91 and M/05. However, conscripts' field uniforms may omit all insignia except the rank markings. In the table above, the army insignia for ranks from Private to Major are depicted on infantry collar patches, with the exception of Officer Student, which features Reserve Officer School collar patches. General officers' collar patches are most often gold on red. However, in some cases, the background of the collar patch retains the original colour of his branch of service.

In the Navy uniform, officers and Warrant officers wear the Lion of Finland on the top of their insignia, while Non-commissioned officers use the special insignia of their duty branch. In field uniforms, these emblems are dropped. Specialist officers always wear their specialist insignia in addition to their rank insignia on the collar patches. On sleeve and shoulder insignia, the specialty is denoted by coloured insignia background.

The NCO students do not wear any collar insignia. Their sole rank insignia consists of a silver line worn on the shoulder or arm of all uniforms, except in M/05 where the silver line is worn on the chest.

Historic rank insignia

Exceptions

General officers

The ranks of field marshal and Marshal of Finland were bestowed on Carl Gustaf Emil Mannerheim in 1933 and 1942, respectively. These are officially not military ranks but honorific titles, but were used like military ranks senior to the rank of general. The insignia used was a general's insignia added with crossed marshal's baton.

All generals from brigadier general to general are addressed as "Mr./Mrs. General"(""), and similarly for admirals.

Historical honorary titles
The rank of general may, as a sign of special recognition, include a service branch: those historically used were general of infantry, general of cavalry and general of artillery. These additions do not affect seniority. There are no living general officers with such recognition, the last one being General of Infantry Adolf Ehrnrooth (1905–2004).

Personnel who fought in the Finnish Jaegers of the German Army during World War I are often referred to as such, e.g.  "Jaeger colonel".

Military civil servants and specialist officers
Personnel serving in technical duties belonging to the officers without officer training hold the position of military civil servant. Their rank is comparable to either first lieutenant, lieutenant or staff sergeant, depending on the level of the civilian education required to serve in this position. The lowest class is reserved for non-salaried military civil servants. Usually the military civil servants are an exception as their positions are likely to be filled by special officers, who have received officer training and hold commissions in addition to civilian academic education. The most typical specialties are engineering and medicine. Civilian interpreters hired for UN peace keeping missions abroad are typically ranked as first lieutenant or lieutenant, according to their civilian education level.

Reservists may be promoted up to the rank of major both in special and normal officer ranks, if they show extraordinary commitment to national defence. In rare cases, reservists have been promoted to the rank of lieutenant colonel.

Chaplains serve in the ranks of chaplain, senior chaplain (literally, "field dean"), and chaplain general (literally, "field bishop"), corresponding to the ranks of captain, lieutenant colonel, and brigadier general, respectively. In addition, they have a personal rank into which they revert at the end of their clerical service in the Finnish Defence Force. Conscript chaplains and deacons serve in their personal rank.

Officer training
Conscripts who have passed a reserve officer course, serve as officer candidates and are considered NCOs ranking always above conscript sergeants but below any career personnel. At the end of their service period, they are promoted to second lieutenants.

Cadets are career military who have already passed their conscription and obtained the reserve officer's training and are now attending their professional officer education in the National Defence University. Cadets are senior to second lieutenants. In addition, the cadets may hold a cadet NCO rank which pertains to the seniority inside the Cadet Corps but does not affect their ranks in relation to other military personnel.

NCO ranks
The NCO ranks in the Finnish Defence Force are filled by conscripts, career NCOs and contractual military personnel at ranks from sargeant to sergeant-major. The basic NCO rank "professional military person" was abolished in 2006. It was position reserved for career NCOs who had not received conscript NCO training. Its relation to other rank and file ranks was unspecified. Nowadays, career NCOs wear a heraldic sword under their chevrons to distinguish them from conscript and contractual sergeants.

The contractual military personnel usually serves in their reserve ranks. Until 2007, reserve officers served in the rank of staff sergeant. This practice has now been abolished and nowadays reserve officers use their reserve rank.

After discharge from the military, both career NCOs and contractual military personnel revert to their personal reserve ranks. The conscripts may hold the NCO rank of officer cadet, sergeant, officer student, or corporal. Reserve personnel may hold any NCO rank.

Special positions
There are some positions, which resemble military ranks in their name, but are not. The position of the "sergeant major of a company" (or other unit such as battery in artillery) is called  "sergeant first class of the company". In past times it was the position of the unit's most senior career NCO, but nowadays the post is held often by someone from sergeant up to senior lieutenant in training units, or by a conscript NCO (etc.) in mobilized units.

Privates
The rank is always given the name specific to the service branch:
 Jaeger in infantry (including mortar personnel, who may be subordinated to artillery units)
 Signalist in signals corps
 Armourman in tank units and armour jaeger in mechanised infantry
 Driver in transport corps
 Gunner in anti-aircraft corps, field artillery and coastal units of the navy
 NBC private in NBC defence units
 Engineer in engineers
 Airman in the air force
 Seaman in the navy
 Coastal jaeger in certain units of Uusimaa Brigade
 Dragoon in the Dragoon Squadron of Army Warfare School - This squadron was disbanded in December 2016
 Cavalryman in the Häme Regiment – This regiment was disbanded in December 2014.
 Guard jaeger in Guard Jaeger Regiment
 Border jaeger in the border guards (conscript rank, enlisted border guard personnel are NCOs in ranks of border guard (sergeant), senior border guard (between staff sergeant and sergeant first class), border guard sergeant (between sergeant first class and master sergeant) and border guard master sergeant.)
 Mechanized Jaeger all mechanized infantrymen privates are addressed by this title

Roughly 10 percent of all privates are promoted to the rank of lance corporal during their service. In comparison, non-commissioned officer students hold either the permanent rank of private or lance corporal and rank accordingly. The recruit,  is a new private, who has not been trained enough to have given a military oath or military guarantee. After having given an oath or such guarantee, the private soldier is not called anymore , but they will be addressed as private or corresponding private level military rank.

Paratroop jaeger and Special jaeger in Utti Jaeger Regiment and Special border jaeger in Special Border Jaeger Company of Border and Coast Guard School are not ranks, but specializations, where NCO training is given and thus each graduate is at minimum .

Notes

References

External links
 

Military ranks of Finland
Military insignia